Kenya toured Zimbabwe for a series of five One Day Internationals in February and March 2006. Before this tour, Kenya had only played five One Day Internationals since reaching the semi-final of the 2003 World Cup, all of which they had lost. They were keen to acquire more international experience before the 2007 World Cup. Zimbabwe had suffered a series of player disputes and poor results amid continuing political troubles in that country, leading to their self-suspension from Test cricket.

The series ended in a 2–2 draw, with one match abandoned. Kenya had never previously drawn or won a One Day International series.

ODI series

1st ODI

2nd ODI

3rd ODI

4th ODI

5th ODI

References

 Wisden Cricketers Almanack

External links
 Series home at ESPN Cricinfo

2006 in Zimbabwean cricket
International cricket competitions in 2005–06
2005-06
Zimbabwean cricket seasons from 2000–01